Acacia binata is a shrub belonging to the genus Acacia and the subgenus Phyllodineae endemic to Western Australia.

Description
It blooms from August to October and produces yellow flowers.

Distribution
It has a discontinuous distribution and is native to an area in the Wheatbelt, Goldfields-Esperance and Great Southern regions of Western Australia where it is found in low-lying areas an undulating plains growing in rocky clay-loam soils.

See also
 List of Acacia species

References

binata
Acacias of Western Australia
Plants described in 1978
Taxa named by Bruce Maslin